Khander is a tehsil located in Torghar District, Khyber Pakhtunkhwa, Pakistan. The population is 74,638 according to the 2017 census.

See also 
 List of tehsils of Khyber Pakhtunkhwa

References 

Tehsils of Khyber Pakhtunkhwa